Mullens Historic District is a national historic district located at Mullens, Wyoming County, West Virginia. It encompasses 95 contributing buildings and one contributing structure in the central business district of Mullens. It also includes surrounding residential areas.  Notable buildings include the Highlawn Baptist Church (1925), Old Presbyterian Church, Wyoming Hotel (1918), Bank of Mullens Building (1920), Masonic Hall Building (1924), Welch Apartment Building (c. 1930), Old Hospital / Webster Apartments (c. 1928), Smiley Department Store Building (1921), Piggly Wiggly Building (1929), Wyoming Theatre (1922), and Norfolk Southern Locomotive Repair Shop Building (1925).

It was listed on the National Register of Historic Places in 1993.

References

National Register of Historic Places in Wyoming County, West Virginia
Historic districts in Wyoming County, West Virginia
Queen Anne architecture in West Virginia
Buildings designated early commercial in the National Register of Historic Places
Buildings and structures in Wyoming County, West Virginia
Bungalow architecture in West Virginia
American Craftsman architecture in West Virginia
Historic districts on the National Register of Historic Places in West Virginia